Veltheim is a German surname. Notable people with the surname include:

August Ferdinand von Veltheim (1741–1801), German mineralogist and geologist
Hans-Hasso von Veltheim (1885–1956), German Indologist, anthroposophist, occultist and author
Jukka Veltheim (born 1984), Finnish football player

German-language surnames